Julian von Haacke (born 14 February 1994) is a German professional footballer who most recently played as a midfielder for Austrian Bundesliga club Austria Klagenfurt.

Early life
Von Haacke was born in Bremen, Germany on 14 February 1994.

Career

Early career and Werder Bremen
Von Haacke was with Post SV Bremen from 1998 to 2005 and Union 60 Bremen from 2005 to 2006 before joining Werder Bremen on 1 July 2006.

Von Haacke made his debut for the club's reserves in a 1–0 loss to SV Meppen on 11 August 2013. He finished the 2013–14 season with three goals in 27 appearances. During the 2014–15 season, von Haacke only made five league appearances scoring one goal and two appearances in the promotional playoff being sidelined with a cruciate ligament injury for most of the season. Werder Bremen II were promoted to the 3. Liga for the 2015–16 season where von Haacke made his professional debut in a 2–1 win against Hansa Rostock on 25 July 2015.

NEC
In June 2016, von Haacke signed a three-year contract with Eredivisie side NEC.

Darmstadt 98
In June 2017, von Haacke moved to 2. Bundesliga club SV Darmstadt 98 on a three-year contract, joining up with manager Torsten Frings who managed him as assistant coach to Viktor Skrypnyk in Werder Bremen's reserve team. The transfer fee was not disclosed.

Von Haacke was released from Darmstadt's training in summer 2018 and occasionally trained with the Werder Bremen reserves in July and August.

On 22 August 2018, he moved to 3. Liga side SV Meppen on loan for the 2018–19 season.

Austria Klagenfurt
On 16 September 2019, von Haacke joined Austrian club SK Austria Klagenfurt on a contract for the 2019–20 season.

Career statistics

References

1994 births
Living people
Footballers from Bremen
Association football midfielders
German footballers
3. Liga players
Eredivisie players
2. Bundesliga players
2. Liga (Austria) players
SV Werder Bremen II players
NEC Nijmegen players
SV Darmstadt 98 players
SV Meppen players
SK Austria Klagenfurt players
German expatriate footballers
German expatriate sportspeople in the Netherlands
Expatriate footballers in the Netherlands
German expatriate sportspeople in Austria
Expatriate footballers in Austria